Andrzej Tęczyński, (b. 1480 – 2 January 1536) Count (title of the Holy Roman Empire, 1527), was a voivode of Lublin, voivode of Sandomierz, voivode of Kraków, Castellan of Kraków. He came from one of the most powerful clans in Lesser Poland, the Tęczyński family.

Career

1503 - Royal Courtier
1510 - Secretary of the Crown
1510 - Chamberlain of Sandomierz
1511 - Castellan of Biecki
1512 - Referendary of the Crown
1515-1519 - Voivode of Lublin
1519 - Voivode of Sandomierz
1527 - He received from the Emperor Ferdinand I the hereditary title of Count of the Empire for his family. The Habsburgs as the Roman emperors gave some Polish families titles of princes and counts of the Sacri Imperii Romagna for gratitude. Thus, the representatives of these families were called hrabiami Roman Empire.
1527 - Voivode of Kraków
1532 - Castellan of Kraków

In addition to these titles Andrzej Tęczyński held offices as: starosta of Sandomierz, starosta of Belz, starosta Chełmski, starosta of Terebovlya, starosta of Krasnystaw, starosta of Hrubieszów, starosta of Sokal, starosta of Ratno Dolne, starosta of Tyszowce. He was murdered by an angry mob in the Franciscan church in Kraków on 2 January 1536 for having slapped a knave.

He is one of the characters on the famous painting by Jan Matejko, Prussian Homage.

References

Attribution
This article is based on the corresponding article of the Polish Wikipedia. A list of contributors can be found there at the History section.

1480 births
1536 deaths
Castellans of Kraków
Lublin Voivodes
Counts of the Holy Roman Empire